Middelburg may refer to:

Places and jurisdictions

Europe
 Middelburg, Zeeland, the capital city of the province of Zeeland, southwestern Netherlands
 Roman Catholic Diocese of Middelburg, a former Catholic diocese with its see in the Zeeland city, Netherlands
 Middelburg, South Holland, a small village near Reeuwijk, Netherlands
 Middelburg, Belgium

South Africa
 Middelburg, Mpumalanga, a large industrial and farming town on the Highveld in South Africa
 Middelburg, Eastern Cape, a town in the Great Karoo, South Africa

Asia-Pacific
 Middelburg Bastion, in the Fortress of Malacca, Malaysia
 Middelburg Island, former name of 'Eua, an island of Tonga

People with the surname 
 Jack Middelburg (1952–1984), Dutch motorcycle road racer
 Paul of Middelburg (1446–1534), Belgian Roman Catholic scientist and bishop